(Fering North Frisian: Wik, a Wik, or Bi a Wik) is the only town on Föhr, the second largest of the North Frisian Islands on the German coast of the North Sea. Like the entire island it belongs to the district of Nordfriesland. Wyk includes the two minor town districts of Boldixum and Südstrand.

Geography 
Wyk is situated on the southeastern edge of the island. About 4,500 inhabitants live there, but during the tourist seasons 20,000 or more people will stay there. It serves as a regional centre for the islands of Föhr and Amrum, providing shopping centres, doctors, a post office, etc. and it is the seat of the Amt Föhr-Amrum and the social care centre for the islands. The approximately 4,200 other inhabitants of Föhr proper live in other villages on the island. Wyk's major source of income is the tourism business.

History and tourism 
In 1704, Wyk was granted the rights of a seaport, two years later, the rights of a market town were awarded. In 1819 a seaside spa was established, being the first of its kind in Schleswig-Holstein.

Thereby the state began to level up with the Baltic Sea region (Heiligendamm, 1794 and the East Frisian North Sea area (Norderney, 1794). In the first year, 61 guests were recorded, in 1820 there were 102, but only from 1840 on the numbers exceeded 200. From 1842 to 1847 the Danish king Christian VIII chose Wyk as his summer resort, which attracted numerous new tourists. In 1844 Hans Christian Andersen followed his king to Wyk and is known to have said about Wyk's beach: "I bathed every day and I must say it was the most remarkable water I have ever been in". But Andersen also criticized the problems of journeying there. For example, from Hamburg, on the road, a traveller needed four days to reach Föhr, by ship via Heligoland, it took two days only but included the danger of sickness.

In 1910 Wyk was granted full town rights.

Wyk's promenade Sandwall does not only offer a view on the sea, but also a view on the Halligen, already beloved by king Christian. It is counted among Germany's most beautiful seaside promenades.

Not at least due to the high number of sanitoriums and recovery institutions, Wyk is a highly frequented spa throughout the year.

In 2002 Wyk belonged to the ten most important centers of tourism in Schleswig-Holstein: 46,368 guests, 325 (0.7%) of which from foreign abroad, booked 492,041 overnight stays. The town had 4,733 beds to offer.

Sights 

Inside Wyk's town limits, in the Olhörn area, there is a minor lighthouse. Frisian customs and the history of Wyk are documented at the Dr. Carl Haeberlin Museum, whose entrance portal is made up of two whale jaw bones.

The church of St. Nicolas is a roman style building from the 13th century, situated in the Boldixum town district. It has got a colourful and amply decorated interior.

Traffic 

Wyk is the only harbour of Föhr, providing a ferry port, a fisheries and freight port and a marina. From the ferry port, several sailings per day are scheduled to the mainland port of Dagebüll while other ferries depart in the opposite direction towards the island of Amrum. Most ferries to Dagebüll have a train connection from there to Hamburg via Niebüll. The ferries are operated by Wyker Dampfschiffsreederei Föhr-Amrum GmbH whose seat is in Wyk.
Other than scheduled ferrying, foray tours are offered to the Halligen of Langeneß and Hooge and in the summer season, passenger ferries sail to Hörnum on Sylt.

Wyk can moreover be reached by small planes via an airstrip, a daily flight schedule connects Föhr and Sylt during the summer season. Bus lines connect to the villages of the island.

Education 
Wyk has a high school (Gymnasium), a Realschule with Hauptschule part, an elementary school including a special school and a Danish school. The town also hosts a branch of Nordfriesland's District School of Music.

Health care 
A district hospital serves the population of Föhr and Amrum. Moreover, a number of sanitoriums are located in town, among them a clinic for oncology, an institution for mothers with children and several other private and public clinics. There is also an old people's home.

Politics 
The local council has 17 members. Since the municipal elections of 2013, the distribution of seats in the town council is as follows:
 Kommunale Gemeinschaft(Local community): 5
 CDU: 5
 SPD: 4
 Green Party: 3

Arms 
Blazon: Gules. On a base azure, wavy, a shipwrecked 17th-century full-rigged ship or, without sails and with broken tops. In chief a mullet of six rays or.

Motto: "Incertum quo fata ferunt". From Latin it translates roughly to "Uncertain (it) is where fate carries us".

Town twinning 
  Mittenwald, Germany

Media 
Wyk is the seat of the editorial office of the daily paper Der Insel-Bote.

Notable people

Born in Wyk 

 Stine Andresen (1849–1927), poet
 Friedrich Christiansen (1879–1972), Luftwaffe General, Supreme Commander of the Wehrmacht in the Netherlands
 Knud Broder Knudsen (1912–2000), politician
 Hans von Storch (born 1949), climate researcher and meteorologist
 Arfst Wagner (born 1954), Waldorf school teacher and editor
 Olaf Jürgen Schmidt (born 1981), German author and theater director

Affiliated with Föhr 
 Sidonie Werner (1860–1932), politician. Founded a sanitorium for Jewish children endangered by tuberculosis (1927–1938) in Wyk.
 Carl Haeberlin (1870–1954), founder of the Frisian museum in Wyk and researcher of Frisian history; pioneer of thalassotherapy
 Hellmuth von Mücke (1881–1957), officer of the Imperial Navy, lived in Wyk 1929–1940
 Hans-Jürgen von Maydell (born 1932), silviculture scientist, graduated from high school in Wyk in 1954
 Heidrun Hesse (1951–2007), Professor of Philosophy, died in Wyk
 Stanfour, a rock band

Honorary citizens 
 Ernst von Prittwitz und Gaffron (1833–1904), Prussian Lieutenant General and knight of the Order of St. John

References

External links 

 Homepage of Wyk auf Föhr

Towns in Schleswig-Holstein
Port cities and towns of the North Sea
Föhr
Seaside resorts in Germany
Nordfriesland
Populated coastal places in Germany (North Sea)